An audio letter is an audio recording sent by postal mail to a recipient. The practice was more common when charges for long-distance telephone services were higher and before the widespread use of the Internet.

Discovered audio recordings offer a unique perspective into that time period and have often been used to present historical context in modern-day radio and television programs.

Media
Media used in recording audio letters include:
 Wax cylinder
 Reel to reel
 Cassette tape
 MiniDisc

References
 MPR Perspective on Vietnam wartime audio letters

External links
 The Audio Kitchen

Letters (message)
Postal systems
Sound recording
Audio works